Carlos Armour (born January 31, 1986) is a former professional Canadian football linebacker who played for the Saskatchewan Roughriders of the Canadian Football League. He was signed as a street free agent by the Roughriders in 2009. He played college football for the Miami Hurricanes.

External links
Saskatchewan Roughriders bio

1986 births
Living people
Players of Canadian football from Memphis, Tennessee
American players of Canadian football
Canadian football linebackers
American football linebackers
Miami Hurricanes football players
Saskatchewan Roughriders players
African-American players of Canadian football
Players of American football from Memphis, Tennessee
21st-century African-American sportspeople
20th-century African-American people